Carnival Spirit is a  operated by Carnival Cruise Line, a subsidiary of Carnival Corporation & plc. Built in Helsinki by Kværner Masa-Yards, she was the first Spirit-class cruise ship to join Carnival's fleet after she was delivered in 2001.

Construction
Built by Kværner Masa-Yards at its Helsinki New Shipyard in Helsinki, Carnival Spirit was launched on 7 July 2000 and completed on 11 April 2001. She was formally named by American politician Elizabeth Dole in Miami on 27 April 2001.

Service history
Previously in the northern fall and winter seasons, Carnival Spirit sailed cruises from San Diego and Los Angeles to the Mexican Riviera. After Carnival Spirits repositioning out of San Diego in April 2012, Carnival ceased operations with that port. During the period from mid-May and ending in September (northern summer), Carnival Spirit sailed the waters alongside the Alaskan Inside Passage on alternating one-week northbound and southbound voyages calling in Vancouver and Seattle. In September 2012, Carnival Spirit sailed to the Hawaiian Islands.

After Carnival Spirit finished her Alaskan and Hawaii cruises, she embarked on a transpacific crossing, calling in Tahiti and Fiji to reposition to Sydney, arriving on 16 October 2012. It marked the first time Carnival based a ship permanently outside North America. She had undergone a dry dock in San Francisco nine months prior to prepare her for the Australian deployment, which included installing Australian-style power points, as well as changing the on-board currency to the Australian dollar. The total cost of the renovations was estimated to total . She sailed her first voyage from Sydney, to the South Pacific and New Zealand, from 20 October 2012.

In May 2016, Carnival announced the ship would sail seasonally from Shanghai beginning in the Australian winter of 2018, making her the first Carnival ship to be based in China. In late-2016, Carnival subsequently reversed this decision and Carnival Spirit continued to sail from Sydney, and explained the Australian market continued to be strong, which did not make the move economically viable in the long term.

In summer 2018, Carnival announced that Carnival Spirit would become the company's first ship to sail from Brisbane from 2020. However, amid the COVID-19 pandemic and its impact on tourism, she never debuted in Brisbane during the cruise industry's pause in operations. In February 2022, Carnival announced she would be redeployed to Jacksonville, Florida and begin operating four-to-five-day itineraries to the Bahamas on 7 March, replacing voyages originally slated for Carnival Ecstasy. It marked a decade since the ship last operated permanently in North America. She is scheduled to move to Seattle to sail in Alaska in summer 2022 and Caribbean from Miami afterwards from 2022 to 2023, replacing sailings planned for Carnival Freedom and has been deployed to begin sailing from Mobile, Alabama in October 2023 following another Alaskan season in Summer 2023.

References

Notes

Bibliography

External links

 Official website

Ships built in Helsinki
Spirit
Panamax cruise ships
2000 ships
Maritime incidents in 2013